Sphingonaepiopsis nana, the savanna hawkmoth, is a moth of the family Sphingidae. The species was first described by Francis Walker in 1856. It is found from the Kerman Province, Hormozgan Province and Baluchistan in southern Iran and western Saudi Arabia to the southern Arabian Peninsula (including the United Arab Emirates, northern Oman and Yemen) and eastern Africa to Natal, west to the Gambia.

The wingspan is 25–30 mm. Adults are on wing in March and April. A specimen captured in early October indicates there might be a second generation.

The larvae feed on various Rubiaceae species, including Kohautia, Galium, Rubia and Jaubertia.

External links

Sphingonaepiopsis
Moths described in 1856
Insects of the Arabian Peninsula
Moths of Sub-Saharan Africa
Lepidoptera of Mozambique
Lepidoptera of Angola
Lepidoptera of Gabon
Lepidoptera of West Africa
Lepidoptera of Tanzania
Lepidoptera of South Africa